The Journal of Occupational and Environmental Medicine (JOEM) is a monthly peer-reviewed medical journal published by Lippincott Williams & Wilkins on behalf of the American College of Occupational and Environmental Medicine (ACOEM). It covers all aspects of occupational medicine and occupational health psychology.

JOEM was established in 1959 as the Journal of Occupational Medicine and obtained its current name in 1995. 

As the official publication of the ACOEM, JOEM publishes ACOEM guidance and position statements several times per year. Each issue of JOEM offers continuing medical education content.

References

External links 
 

Publications established in 1959
Occupational safety and health journals
Monthly journals
English-language journals
Lippincott Williams & Wilkins academic journals
Environmental health journals